Vladimir Tell (26 July 1899 – 2 March 1925) was an Estonian footballer.

He was born in Tallinn.

He began his football career at the age of 17, when he joined with the sport club Tallinna SS Olümpia. In 1920, he joined with the sport club SK Tallinna Sport. 1921, 1922 and 1924 the club won Estonian championships. He represented 11 times Estonia men's national football team; he scored 5 times. 

He died into tuberculosis.

References

1899 births
1925 deaths
Estonian footballers
Footballers from Tallinn
Tuberculosis deaths in Estonia
20th-century deaths from tuberculosis